Rejean "Ray" Shero (born July 28, 1962) is an American former ice hockey executive who served as the general manager of the Pittsburgh Penguins and New Jersey Devils franchises.

Shero was the general manager of the Penguins from 2006 to 2014. He was fired after the Penguins' second round exit from the 2014 playoffs. His tenure with the Devils lasted from May 4, 2015, when he replaced Lou Lamoriello, until he was fired on January 12, 2020. 

Shero is the son of former Philadelphia Flyers and New York Rangers coach Fred Shero.

Playing career
Shero played his college ice hockey for the St. Lawrence Saints, captaining the team during the 1984–85 season. He was drafted by the Los Angeles Kings in 1982, but never played in the NHL.

Executive career
Before joining the Penguins in 2006, Shero was an assistant general manager first for the Ottawa Senators from 1993 to 1998 and then for the Nashville Predators from their entrance into the league in 1998 until 2006.

Pittsburgh Penguins (2006–2014)
In his first season on the job with the Pittsburgh Penguins, Shero made a small splash in the free agent market, signing forwards Mark Recchi and Jarkko Ruutu, along with defenseman Mark Eaton. In addition to these moves, he traded for forwards Nils Ekman and Dominic Moore, after drafting center Jordan Staal with the second overall pick in the 2006 NHL Entry Draft. This choice paid immediate dividends, as Staal would score 29 goals and 42 points in his rookie year with fellow rookie Evgeni Malkin.

At the trade deadline of the 2006–07 NHL season, Shero swung two major trades, sending Noah Welch to the Florida Panthers for veteran Gary Roberts, and sending Daniel Carcillo and a draft pick to the Phoenix Coyotes for enforcer Georges Laraque.

Shero made several tweaks to his club during the next off-season, signing defenseman Darryl Sydor, forwards Petr Sýkora and Jeff Taffe, and backup goaltender Dany Sabourin. Shero also took several steps to ensure that his nucleus of talent remained in Pittsburgh by re-signing defenseman Ryan Whitney to a six-year, $24 million contract extension, and re-signing center and captain Sidney Crosby to a five-year, $43.5 million extension.

On July 16, 2007, Shero announced that he had re-signed head coach Michel Therrien to a one-year extension through the 2008–09 NHL season.

The trade deadline of the 2007–08 NHL season brought two other major trades for Shero and the Pittsburgh Penguins, sending Colby Armstrong, Erik Christensen, prospect Angelo Esposito, and a future draft pick for the Atlanta Thrashers' Marián Hossa and Pascal Dupuis, as well as bringing the Toronto Maple Leafs' defenseman Hal Gill to his team for two future draft picks.

In 2009, the Penguins defeated the Detroit Red Wings in seven games to win the Stanley Cup. They won the cup on the road at the Joe Louis Arena. The Red Wings defeated the Penguins the year before in the 2008 Stanley Cup Finals at Mellon Arena.

On May 16, 2014, the Penguins fired Shero after the team fell to the Rangers in seven games during the second round of the 2014 Stanley Cup playoffs. The Penguins had held a 3–1 series lead heading into Game 5 of the series. This was also the fifth straight year the Penguins were eliminated by a lower-seeded opponent.

New Jersey Devils (2015–2020)
Shero became the general manager of the New Jersey Devils on May 4, 2015. Notable acquisitions and free agent signings during Shero's tenure as general manager include Taylor Hall, Will Butcher, Jesper Bratt, Kyle Palmieri, Sami Vatanen, P. K. Subban, Wayne Simmonds, Jack Hughes, and Nico Hischier. Despite struggling for the first few years, the Devils returned to the Stanley Cup playoffs in 2018 but were eliminated in the first round 4–1 by the Tampa Bay Lightning.

Shero was fired by the Devils on January 12, 2020. Assistant general manager Tom Fitzgerald was named as his replacement.

References

External links
 
 Hockey Smarts Run in Shero Family at NHL.com 7 Aug 2006.

1962 births
Living people
American men's ice hockey centers
American people of Russian descent
Ice hockey people from Minnesota
Los Angeles Kings draft picks
Nashville Predators personnel
National Hockey League general managers
New Jersey Devils executives
Ottawa Senators general managers
Pittsburgh Penguins executives
Sportspeople from Saint Paul, Minnesota
St. Lawrence Saints men's ice hockey players
Stanley Cup champions
Ice hockey people from Saint Paul, Minnesota